Penny Dwyer (born Penelope Rosemary Dwyer; 24 September 1953 – 4 September 2003) was a British comedy writer and performer, noted for being a member of the Cambridge Footlights revue The Cellar Tapes which won the inaugural Perrier Comedy Awards in 1981. The other performers in The Cellar Tapes were Stephen Fry, Hugh Laurie, Emma Thompson, Tony Slattery and Paul Shearer.

Early life and education
Dwyer was educated at the University of Cambridge.

Career
Dwyer worked as a writer and performer in Cambridge throughout the late 1970s and early 1980s; however, unlike her fellow Perrier winners, she chose not to pursue a full-time career in the entertainment business. Instead becoming a metallurgist, Dwyer had a major role in the construction of the Channel Tunnel.

Death
Dwyer died in Somerset in 2003 aged 49, following a long illness.

References

1953 births
2003 deaths
Actresses from Bristol
Alumni of the University of Cambridge
English women comedians
British women engineers
English metallurgists
20th-century English comedians
20th-century English women
20th-century English people